The Roman Catholic Church in Togo is composed of 1 ecclesiastical province and 6 suffragan dioceses.

List of dioceses

Episcopal Conference of Togo

Ecclesiastical Province of Lomé
Archdiocese of Lomé
Diocese of Aného
Diocese of Atakpamé
Diocese of Dapaong
Diocese of Kara
Diocese of Kpalimé
Diocese of Sokodé

Togo
Catholic dioceses